The 1976 Scottish Cup Final was played on 1 May 1976 at Hampden Park in Glasgow and was the final of the 91st Scottish Cup. Rangers and Hearts contested the match, Rangers won the match 3–1 with Derek Johnstone (2) and Alex MacDonald scoring for Rangers, Graham Shaw getting the goal for Hearts.

Rangers dominated the game from the whistle with Johnstone scoring after only 42 seconds, the quickest goal scored in the Cup final. The referee had kicked off the match a couple of minutes early so the goal was scored before the official kick-off time. MacDonald put them two up just before the break and Johnstone wrapped it up with a third in 81 minutes. Shaw scored a consolation for Hearts in the 83rd minute.

The win sealed the third treble for Rangers and was their 21st Scottish Cup win.

Match details

References

External links
SFA report

1976
Cup Final
Rangers F.C. matches
Heart of Midlothian F.C. matches
1970s in Glasgow
May 1976 sports events in the United Kingdom